Xanthorrhoea quadrangulata is a plant in the genus Xanthorrhoea. It is endemic to the state of South Australia.

Gallery

References

quadrangulata
Flora of South Australia
Endemic flora of Australia
Plants described in 1864
Taxa named by Ferdinand von Mueller